Saint-Mandé is a station on Line 1 of the Paris Métro, which is located in the commune of Saint-Mandé, just outside the Boulevard Périphérique. It was called Tourelle until 1937, when it was renamed Saint-Mandé - Tourelle. On 26 July 2002, "Tourelle" was dropped from the name.

Station layout

See also
 List of stations of the Paris Métro

References
Roland, Gérard (2003). Stations de métro. D’Abbesses à Wagram. Éditions Bonneton.

Paris Métro stations in Saint-Mandé
Railway stations in France opened in 1934